Cathedral Mountain  is a  complex massif located six kilometres northwest of Lake O'Hara in Yoho National Park, in the Canadian Rockies of British Columbia, Canada. Its shape and structure conjures up a resemblance to a gothic cathedral that has inspired many artists, including Group of Seven's Arthur Lismer, to paint it back in 1928. This picturesque mountain is visible from Highway 1, the Trans-Canada Highway near Kicking Horse Pass. Its nearest higher peak is Mount Stephen,  to the west. To prevent damage to its operations, CP Rail pumps overflow from Teacup Lake down the west face of Cathedral in order to minimize the subglacial lake's discharging in a phenomenon known as a jökulhlaup.

History

The name Cathedral Mountain was in use as early as 1884 and appeared on George Dawson's 1886 map. The first ascent of Cathedral Mountain was made in 1901 by James Outram, with guides Joseph Bossoney, and Christian Klucker. The mountain's name was officially adopted in 1924 when approved by the Geographical Names Board of Canada.

Geology

Cathedral Mountain  is composed of sedimentary rock laid down during the Precambrian to Cambrian periods. Formed in shallow seas, this sedimentary rock was pushed east and over the top of younger rock during the Laramide orogeny.

Climate

Based on the Köppen climate classification, Cathedral Mountain  is located in a subarctic climate with cold, snowy winters, and mild summers.

Cathedral Crags

Cathedral Crags (3082 m) are striking pinnacles with steep, reddish cliffs located one kilometre northwest of the summit of Cathedral Mountain, near Kicking Horse Pass and the Spiral Tunnels Viewpoint. This rocky feature of Cathedral Mountain was first climbed in 1900 by James Outram, and W. Outram, with Christian Hasler Sr. as guide. The crag's name was officially adopted in 1952 by the Geographical Names Board of Canada.

References

Gallery

External links

 Parks Canada web site: Yoho National Park
 Arthur Lismer's painting of Cathedral Mountain: Art History
 J. E. H. MacDonald's 1927 painting of Cathedral Mountain: Wikimedia Commons

Three-thousanders of British Columbia
Canadian Rockies
Kootenay Land District
Mountains of Yoho National Park